Rockwall Christian Academy is permanently closed as of Fall 2015. 
RCA was a private Christian school located in Rowlett, Texas. The school was founded in 1987, and it educates about 180 students in kindergarten to grade 12.

References

External links 
 School website

Christian schools in Texas
Educational institutions established in 1987
Private K-12 schools in Texas
High schools in Dallas County, Texas
Nondenominational Christian schools in the United States
1987 establishments in Texas